Durga Bhagwati (Nepali: दुर्गा भगवती) is a rural municipality in Rautahat District, a part of Province No. 2 in Nepal. It was formed in 2016 occupying current 5 sections (wards) from previous 5 former VDCs. It occupies an area of 19.80 km2 with a total population of 22,599.

References 

Populated places in Rautahat District
Rural municipalities of Nepal established in 2017
Rural municipalities in Madhesh Province